The list of ship launches in 1711 includes a chronological list of some ships launched in 1711.


References

1711
Ship launches